Leave It to Beaver is a 1997 American comedy film based on the television series of the same name. Many in-jokes and sub-plots relating to the series are adapted for the film. It features many of the original regular characters, most played by new actors, with some cameos by the original TV cast. Universal Pictures released the film on August 22, 1997.

Plot
The movie opens with a bakery truck driving down the street, and Beaver and Wally riding together on the latter's bicycle, delivering morning newspapers. Beaver tosses the newspapers wildly into the air with both hands: one of them plops into wet cement, others land on two roofs, one into a dog's mouth, one into a birdbath, one onto a cat, one into a man's leaf-vacuum nozzle, and one onto a painter's head. Then the leaf vacuum explodes and throws dirt through the bakery truck driver's window, causing him to slam on the brakes and have his sticky pies thrown about. Beaver and Wally apologize and ride away.

Beaver has his heart set on a bike in a store window but does not think Ward and June will buy it for him. Eddie Haskell tells him that if he flatters Ward by signing up for football, he will get it on his birthday. Beaver joins the football team and endures the practices, despite his disadvantage of being smaller than his teammates. He even goes so far as to refuse Ward reading him a bedtime story and kissing him goodnight. He looks forward to his first game. Ward is glad he signed up for football, but his first game ends poorly when he is tricked into passing the ball to a kid on the opposing team, whom he remembered as a friend from summer camp. When he celebrates his birthday, he is presented with the new bike, as well as a computer from his great aunt.

On the first day of school, five days later, Ward and June tell Wally to accompany Beaver for a few days while he gets used to riding his new bike to there. He has a kind new teacher named Miss Landers. After school, Eddie asks Wally to come to the soda shop to see him flirt with Karen. Eddie does not want Beaver to follow them, so Wally leaves him alone at the bike rack, telling him he will be back for him. He is polishing his bike when a teenage boy comes over and asks if he can show him some cool bike tricks. He agrees and the boy shows him some tricks before riding off with the bike. At the soda shop, Karen likes Wally and not Eddie. When Wally and Eddie come out and hear that Beaver's bike was stolen, they look for it, but can't find it. During dinner that night, Beaver and Wally try to cover up for the missing bike. When Ward finds out the truth, he is upset with Beaver, but angrier at Wally because he was responsible for watching him. In Beaver and Wally's bedroom, they get into a fight, which sends Beaver's new computer flying out the window. Wally grabs the wire and tries to pull it in, but the wire breaks, and it crashes on the ground and smashes into pieces. This results in Ward completely losing all of his patience and grounding Beaver and Wally.

After the grounding, Beaver skips football practice and studies; and Wally spends time with Karen, who breaks up with him after reuniting with her ex-boyfriend, Kyle. Beaver goes into the city and gets hit by a truck but is unharmed. He encounters the boy who stole his bike. The boy, who is Kyle's younger brother, challenges him, as a way of getting his bike back, to climb up to a gigantic coffee mug atop the local cafe, which Beaver falls into and can't get out of. The fire department and Ward help get him down, Ward realizing he may be under too much pressure. Ward had found out about him skipping football practice and says he can quit the team; but he rejoins it. During the last game, he catches the ball and scores a touchdown, while chasing after his stolen bike. At the Mayfield Festival, he again encounters the boy and chases him. Kyle trips Beaver to help his brother escape, and Wally retaliates by pushing Kyle into a tub of fudge. Karen is also put off by Kyle's bullying and leaves him for Wally. Beaver uses a concession stand to block the boy's way, causing him to fly across a judges' table of pies set up to be judged and into an entire cart of them, resulting in Beaver getting his bike back. At home, Ward sees him polishing it, tells him that it would be safer if it stays in the house, and, at his request, reads him a bedtime story.

Cast
Christopher McDonald as Ward Cleaver
Janine Turner as June Cleaver
Cameron Finley as Theodore "Beaver" Cleaver
Erik von Detten as Wallace "Wally" Cleaver
Adam Zolotin as Eddie Haskell, Jr.
Erika Christensen as Karen L. Connelly
Alan Rachins as Fred Rutherford
Grace Phillips as Miss Landers
E.J. de la Peña as Larry Mondello
Justin Restivo as Lumpy
Geoff Pierson as Coach Gordon
Louis Martin Braga as Gilbert Bates
Shirley Prestia as Clara Hensler
Brighton Hertford as Judy Hensler
Fran Bennett as Dr. Beawood
Glenn Walker Harris Jr. as a boy who steals Beaver's bike
Matthew Carey as Kyle
Brenda Song as Susan Akatsu

Cameos by actors and actresses from the television series
Barbara Billingsley as Aunt Martha
Ken Osmond as Eddie Haskell, Sr.
Frank Bank as Frank

Production
5,000 actors auditioned for the role of Beaver.

Reception
The film was poorly received by critics, as it currently holds a rating of 21% on Rotten Tomatoes based on 28 reviews. The site's consensus states: "Declining to update the television series' sensibility for modern audiences while lacking in its requisite charm, Leave it to Beaver should have just left these characters in the past."

Roger Ebert gave it 3 out of 4 stars writing, "I was surprised to find myself seduced by the film’s simple, sweet story, and amused by the sly indications that the Cleavers don’t live in the 1950s anymore."

Box office
The film grossed an estimated $10.9 million in the United States and Canada against a $15 million production budget.

Home media
The film was released on January 20, 1998 on VHS, DVD, and LaserDisc.  It was re-released on DVD on March 20, 2007, as part of a 'Family Favorites 4-Movie Collection' (with The Little Rascals, Casper, and Flipper). All are presented in anamorphic widescreen.

On August 13, 2019 it was released on Blu-ray.

Cancelled sequels
Prior to the film's release Universal signed the cast for 2 sequels. They were quietly cancelled after the film underperformed at the box office.

References

External links

 
 
 
 
 

1997 comedy films
1997 films
American comedy films
Films based on television series
Leave It to Beaver
Universal Pictures films
Films scored by Randy Edelman
1997 directorial debut films
1990s English-language films
Films directed by Andy Cadiff
1990s American films